Struve is a surname. Notable people with the surname include:

Astronomers
 Struve family
Jacob Struve (1755–1841)
Friedrich Georg Wilhelm von Struve (1793–1864), son of Jacob
Otto Wilhelm von Struve (1819–1905), son of Friedrich
Gustav Wilhelm Ludwig Struve (Ludwig Struve, 1858–1920), son of Otto
Karl Hermann Struve (Hermann Struve, 1854–1920), son of Otto
Otto Struve (1897–1963), son of Ludwig
Georg Hermann Struve (Georg Struve, 1886–1933), son of Hermann
Wilfried Struve (1914–1992), son of Georg

Other people
 Amand Struve (1835–1898), Baltic German military engineer and bridge specialist
Gleb Struve (1898–1985), Russian-American poet and literary historian, son of Peter
Gustav Struve (1805–1870), Southern German politician and revolutionary
Henryk Struve (1840–1912), Polish philosopher
Karl de Struve (1835–1907), Russian Envoy Extraordinary and Minister Plenipotentiary to Tokyo, Washington, and the Hague
Nikita Struve (1931–2016), Russian-French editor specializing in Russian literature, nephew of Gleb and grandson of Peter
Peter Berngardovich Struve (1870–1944), Russian political economist, philosopher and editor, grandson of Friedrich Georg Wilhelm
Stefan Struve (born 1988), Dutch mixed martial artist
Vasily Vasilievich Struve (1889–1965), Soviet Orientalist

Things named after the Struve astronomers
2227 Otto Struve, an asteroid named after Otto Struve
Struve (crater), a crater on the Moon
 Struve functions, named after Karl Hermann Struve
Struve Geodetic Arc, a World Heritage Site
Otto Struve Telescope, a telescope of McDonald Observatory
Struve Double Star Catalog, compiled by F. G. W. Struve
Struve 1341, a binary star system with an extrasolar planet
Struve 2398, a binary star system

See also
Struve–Sahade effect, a phenomenon in astronomical spectroscopy, named after Otto Struve and  Jorge Sahade
768 Struveana, an asteroid named jointly after Friedrich Georg Wilhelm von Struve, Otto Wilhem von Struve, and Karl Hermann Struve